Hope Island is a suburb in the City of Gold Coast, Queensland, Australia.

There are three towns within the suburb, each established around a real estate development:

 Sanctuary Cove, a gated community in the north of the suburb
 Boykambil in the east of the suburb
 Santa Barbara in the west of the suburb

Geography 

Hope Island is positioned on the northern Gold Coast. It is bounded by the Coomera River to the west, north-west, and north. The river then splits into a northern and southern branch around Coomera Island to east. the southern branch bounds Hope Island to the east. Hope Island is bounded to the south-west and south by Saltwater Creek. The undeveloped Coomera Island lies to the east of the Hope Island preventing direct access to Moreton Bay.

Hope Harbour is in the east of the suburb providing boat access to the southern branch of the Coomera River.

The Pacific Motorway is to the west passing through the neighbouring suburb of Helensvale.

History 
The Indigenous name for the area was Boykambil.

The area was named after colonial aristocrat Captain Louis Hope, who in 1867 was granted the island then known as Boykambil near the mouth of the Coomera River in recognition of his contribution in developing the sugar industry in Queensland.

After arriving in Moreton Bay in 1848, Hope spent the next 20 years building sugar plantations on the edge of Moreton Bay. The development of a sugar plantation called ‘Rockholm’ on the Island was largely undertaken by the Grimes Family. By the twentieth century, the sugar and arrowroot plantation had passed into the hands of the Sheehan and Davidson families. Hope himself never actually lived in the suburb of Hope Island, preferring to live in Ormiston on the edge of Moreton Bay.

Education 
There are no schools in Hope Island. The nearest government primary schools are Coomera State School in neighbouring Coomera to the west and Coombabah State School in Coombabah to the south-east. The nearest government secondary school is Helensvale State High School in neighbouring Helensvale to the south-west.

Amenities 

There are a number of marinas in the suburb, including:

 Hope Harbour Marina in the east of the suburb accessed from the south branch of the Coomera River
 Hope Island Resort Marina, in the west of the suburb accessed from Saltwater Creek
 Sanctuary Cove Marina, in the north of the suburb where Coomer River splits into two branches

There is also a boat ramp and jetty at Boykambil Esplanade South in the south-east of the suburb on the north bank of Coombabah Creek. It is managed by the Gold Coast City Council.

Hope Island has shops, restaurants and three golf courses within close proximity. Hope Island is home to the upmarket Hope Island Resort and Sanctuary Cove. Community facilities include a harbour front dining/shopping precinct, deep water mooring facilities and luxury housing.

Hope Island is currently undergoing major strategic planning by developers, together with the Gold Coast City Council, who advocate mixed use (that is, parallel commercial and residential development).

Transport
Hope Island is serviced by many transport options for both local and inter-city commuting. It is located adjacent to the M1 motorway connecting it with the rest of the Gold Coast and Brisbane, as well as 20 minutes from the Coomera railway station with regular direct services to Brisbane city and airport.

Golf buggies are a popular form of transport within Hope Island Resort and the neighbouring Sanctuary Cove Resort. A buggy path linking the two resorts has recently been completed by Gold Coast City Council, allowing Sanctuary Cove and Hope Island Resort residents to access each other's resorts.

Hope Island is also serviced by bus services 711 & 718 which are operated by Surfside Buslines, The 711 bus service route is from Sanctuary Cove to Southport running hourly, the 718 bus route from Santa Barbara to Helensvale Station runs on a less frequent basis.

Sport and recreation
Recreation areas include Robert Dalley Park, and the Pat Cash Tennis Academy.

There are three golf courses:

 Palms Golf Course in the north of the suburb
 The Pines Golf Course in the centre of the suburb
 Hope Island Golf Course in the south-west of the suburb
The Pat Cash International Tennis Academy is a sports centre.

Commercial areas
Hope Island Marina Shopping Village is a tropical style, waterfront, open-air shopping and dining centre located on the Hope Island Resort Marina. Its major tenant is Coles, along with a number of specialty stores as well as waterfront cafes and restaurants. There is a large medical centre (Hope Island Medical Centre), optometrist practice (Hope Island Optical, next to coles) and pharmacy. There are smaller shopping areas at Hope Island Central and along Hope Island Road including veterinary clinics, child care facilities, shopping, and services.

A recently completed buggy path allows Hope Island Resort residents easy access to the commercial area and dining precinct within Sanctuary Cove, as well as the Intercontinental Hotel and other facilities.

Hope Island Resort
A large portion of Hope Island is home to the Hope Island Resort, an  gated community with facilities such as marina, half-Olympic pool, golf course, tennis and 24-hour security.

Links Hope Island (part of Hope Island Resort) is home to an 18-hole championship course designed by five-time British Open champion Peter Thomson.

Hope Island Resort has its own private broadband network. A modern Hybrid Fibre Coax (HFC) network which is used for cable television delivery, the gate intercom, community telephony, security and super-fast Internet delivery to all residents.  Newer parts of the resort have a full fibre-to-the-premises (FTTP) connection.

References

External links

 

 
Suburbs of the Gold Coast, Queensland